The Schijen is a mountain in the Schwyzer Alps, overlooking the Obersee and Klöntalersee on its northern and southern side respectively. It lies west of Glarus in Switzerland.

References

External links
Schijen on Hikr

Mountains of the Alps
Mountains of Switzerland
Mountains of the canton of Glarus
Two-thousanders of Switzerland